Myrceugenia myrcioides is a species of plant in the family Myrtaceae. It is endemic to Brazil.

References

myrcioides
Endemic flora of Brazil
Near threatened plants
Taxonomy articles created by Polbot